East Burke is a census-designated place in the town of Burke in Caledonia County, Vermont, United States. Its population was 132 as of the 2010 census. It is home to Burke Mountain and Burke Mountain Academy.

References

Census-designated places in Vermont
Census-designated places in Caledonia County, Vermont